Badkulla railway station is part of the Kolkata Suburban Railway system and operated by Eastern Railway. It is located on the Ranaghat–Krishnanagar line in Nadia in the Indian state of West Bengal.

Track layout
Badkulla station has three tracks and one side platforms and two Island platform. These platforms are connected by foot overbridge.

See also

References

External links 

 Badkulla Station Map

Sealdah railway division
Railway stations in Nadia district
Kolkata Suburban Railway stations